Frederick John Brewer Barker (23 December 1917 – 29 October 1989) was an Australian rules footballer who played for Hawthorn in the VFL. Barker was a centre half back and won Hawthorn's 'Best and Fairest' award in 1942.

Off the field he worked as a fireman and once played a game despite suffering smoke inhalation the previous night.

References

External links

1917 births
Australian rules footballers from Victoria (Australia)
Hawthorn Football Club players
Peter Crimmins Medal winners
1989 deaths
Australian firefighters